The following is a list of built-up areas in Wales by population according to the 2011 Census.

See also
List of cities in Wales
List of towns in Wales

References 

Loc
Towns
Geography of Wales